Joachim Nielsen (born 17 September 2003) is a Danish footballer who plays as a forward for Danish 1st Division club AC Horsens.

Career

Horsens
Nielsen is a product of AC Horsens. He got his official debut for Horsens on 24 May 2021 in a Danish Superliga game against OB. Nielsen started on the bench, before replacing Angelo Nehme in the 72nd minute. This was his only first team appearance in the 2020–21 season.

References

External links

2003 births
Living people
Danish men's footballers
Association football forwards
Danish Superliga players
AC Horsens players
People from Horsens
Sportspeople from the Central Denmark Region